Nikephoros Kabasilas was a Byzantine military commander.

In ca. 1024 he held the post of doux of Thessalonica. Along with David of Ohrid, the strategos of Samos, and the fleet of the Cibyrrhaeots, he confronted a Rus' raid into the Aegean Sea. After forcing their way past the Byzantine defences at the Dardanelles, the Rus', some 800 strong, had made landfall at Lemnos, where the Byzantine commanders confronted them. Feigning negotiations, the Byzantines fell upon the Rus' by surprised and annihilated them.

References

Sources
 

11th-century Byzantine people
Byzantine generals
Byzantine governors of Thessalonica
Rus'–Byzantine wars
Generals of Basil II